Aik Thi Misaal is a Pakistani television program which was based on a novel of the same name by Rukhsana Nigar. It was first aired on 14 September 2015 in Hum TV. It was directed by Shaquille Khan and written by Rukhsana Nigar. The teledrama was ended on 12 January 2016.

Story
Ek Thi Misal highlights the situation of the young girl Misal, whose perfect world is flipped around on account of the desire and envy of her close relative and grandma, prompting to her parents' separation. It is concurred that Misal will spend 15 days of the month with her dad, and the rest of the 15 with her mom.

Here begins the predicament and hardships of Misal as her life swings between her mom's and dad's homes. Both her parents remarry to go ahead with their lives yet for Misal, the sentiment dismissal from her parents and hatred of her step-mother, step-father and whatever is left of the family develops with each passing day.

Characters

First Generation 
 Adeel  Adeel is the male protagonist and Misaal's Father. He married Bushra. The couple had a Daughter Misaal. The couple separated because of dispute. He then married Iffat. 
 Bushra  Bushra is the female protagonist and first wife of Adeel. She had a daughter Misaal. They were separated because of disputes between her and her husband Adeel. She later married Ahsan. She had a daughter Rania.
 Iffat  Iffat is the second wife of Adeel. She always disliked Misaal and her mother Bushra. She thinks that Adeel had always loved Misaal more than her and her children but Adeel had always kept everyone equal.
 Aasma was the teacher of Misaal and the mother of Wasik and Warda.
 Waqar  Waqar is the friend of Adeel and father of Fahad. He moved his proposal forward of marrying his son with Adeel's daughter Misaal. The Nikah was not accepted as Fahad had already married a woman Laila and has a daughter.

Second Generation 
 Misaal  (Portrayed by Hina Altaf ) : Misaal is the daughter of Adeel and Bushra. Misaal was first liked by her foster brother Saifi. Ahsan finally sent Misaal from his home. Misaal now lived with her father and his second wife Iffat and her children. Iffat always disliked Misaal as her father liked her more than her daughter and son. Iffat became happy after her engagement with Fahad. The Nikah was cancelled at the last moment because Fahad had already married Laila and had a daughter. Wasik took proposal of marrying Misaal, Adeel accepted. The problems between Wasik and Pari let Wasik hate with Misaal.
 Fahad  Fahad is the son of Waqar. He married Laila and spend more time in office works. Adeel decided to marry his daughter to Waqar's son Fahad. Waqar kept his son's marriage with Laila a secret to Adeel. This made Adeel angry with Waqar.
 Dani  Dani also known as Daniyal, is the son of Adeel through his second wife Iffat. He was a careless spoiled boy and a smoker. He always failed in his studies and made his father angry.
 Rania  Rania is the daughter of Bushra, through her second husband Ahsan. She is half sister of Saifi (through Ahsan). She is the half sister of Misaal (Through Bushra).
 Saifi  Saifi is the son of Ahsan and his first wife (name not known). He is half brother of Rania. He is the foster brother of Misaal. He always liked Misaal. He always misbehaved with Misaal. 
 Wasik  Wasik is the son of Misaal's teacher. When Misaal first time came into her teacher's home. Wasik saw her and liked her. He said that she will be  his first and last love but Misaal ignored him. Wasik was liked by Pari, daughter of Iffat but Wasik didn't like Pari. She later disliked Misaal as Wasik married Misaal.
 Warda  Warda is the daughter of Misaal's teacher and sister of Wasik. She disliked Misaal as she was Pari's (Iffat's daughter) best friend and Warda always wanted her brother Wasik to marry Pari.

Deaths in Drama as an acting 
In its last episode, several acting deaths took place.
 Ahsan's death He had heart failure and suddenly died before his daughter Rania's marriage.
 Shehzad's father's death As we know that Shahzad's father stole Wasik's family's money. He didn't use to sleep correctly and all his life he was in guilt, as a result he died after taking too much stress.
 Pari's critical health Pari had done too much to separate Wasik and Misaal. Saifi gunned her and forced to sleep with him, Pari refused, Saifi hit her with a gun and raped her.
 Misaal's critical health Pari's plan succeeded this time, separating Misaal and Wasiq through Misaal's half-brother Saifi. Saifi lied and told Wasiq that your wife loves me, Wasik didn't believe his wife and hit her, Misaal fell and got unconscious, as a result was admitted, later she got cured.

Misaal's Maternal and Paternal Grandmother also died but there is no proper reason of their deaths.

Cast 
 Hina Altaf Khan as Misaal 
 Emmad Irfani as Adeel 
 Rabab Hashim as Bushra 
 Muneeb Butt as Wasiq 
 Sara Saif as Misaal (Young)
 Hira Pervaiz as Iffat 
 Hasan Ahmed as Ahsan 
 Mahi Baloch as Pareezay (Pari) 
 Huma Nawab as Asma
 Zainab Qayyum as Fouzia
 Jahanara Hai as Missal's grandmother	
 Mubashira Khanum as Adeel's mother
 Ali Ansari as Saifi
 Sajida Syed as Bushra's mother 
 Jahanzeb Khan as Imran
 Mustufa Kazmi 
 Hammad Khan As Saifi (Young)

Broadcast and release 
 It was aired on Hum Europe in UK, on Hum TV USA in USA and Hum TV Mena on UAE, with same timings and 14 September 2015 being the premier date. All International broadcasting aired the series in accordance with their standard times.
 In 2018, the show premiered on MBC 2.
Aik Thi Misaal is available digitally on Eros Now app to stream online.

See also 
 List of programs broadcast by Hum TV

References 

2015 Pakistani television series debuts
2016 Pakistani television series endings
Pakistani drama television series